Dupax may refer to:

 Dupax del Norte, Nueva Vizcaya, Philippines
 Dupax del Sur, Nueva Vizcaya, Philippines